The John F. Kennedy Memorial by Neil Estern is installed in Brooklyn's Grand Army Plaza, in the U.S. state of New York. It features a bronze bust of John F. Kennedy on a Regal Grey granite pedestal. The current monument was dedicated on August 24, 2010, which replaced one previously dedicated on May 31, 1965.

See also

 List of memorials to John F. Kennedy
 Cultural depictions of John F. Kennedy

References

External links
 

Bronze sculptures in Brooklyn
Busts in New York City
Busts of presidents of the United States
Grand Army Plaza
Granite sculptures in New York City
Monuments and memorials in Brooklyn
Monuments and memorials to John F. Kennedy in the United States
Outdoor sculptures in Brooklyn
Sculptures of men in New York City